Adam Morong (born 16 June 1993) is a Slovak professional footballer who currently plays for MFK Skalica .

AS Trenčín
He made his debut for AS Trenčín against Rimavská Sobota on 21 May 2011. In Corgoň Liga, Morong debuted on 19 November 2011 against DAC Dunajská Streda.

References

External links
Futbalnet Profile
AS Trenčín Profile

1993 births
Living people
People from Galanta
Sportspeople from the Trnava Region
Association football midfielders
Slovak footballers
Slovakia youth international footballers
AS Trenčín players
MFK Tatran Liptovský Mikuláš players
ŠKF Sereď players
FC Nitra players
FK Senica players
MFK Ružomberok players
MFK Skalica players
2. Liga (Slovakia) players
Slovak Super Liga players